The Offaly Senior Football Championship is an annual Gaelic football competition contested by top-tier Offaly GAA clubs. The Offaly County Board of the Gaelic Athletic Association has organised it since 1896.

Rhode are the title holders (2022), defeating Tullamore on a scoreline of 1-09 to 0-11 in the Final.

Format
Current teams

The 8 clubs competing in the 2021 Offaly Senior Football Championship are:

Rhode, Durrow, Tullamore, Edenderry, Cappincur, Bracknagh, Ferbane and Shamrocks.

Honours
The trophy presented to the winners is ? The club winning the Offaly Championship qualifies to represent the county in the Leinster Senior Club Football Championship, the winner of which progresses to the All-Ireland Senior Club Football Championship.

List of finals

Wins listed by club

References

External links
Official Offaly Website
Offaly on Hoganstand
Offaly Club GAA
Various County final programmes

 
Offaly GAA club championships
Senior Gaelic football county championships